Alexis Emanuel Vaiani (born 30 April 1998) is an Argentine professional footballer who plays as a forward.

Career
Vaiani got his career underway with Comunicaciones; having signed in 2017 from Nueva Chicago. His professional debut arrived in the 2017–18 campaign against Estudiantes on 12 September 2017, which preceded his first goal coming on 1 October during a two-nil win over Talleres. In total, Vaiani made five appearances in his opening season; all of which were off the substitutes bench. His first match as a starter arrived in a March 2019 loss to Almirante Brown. Vaiani left Comunicaciones in December 2019.

Career statistics
.

References

External links

1998 births
Living people
Place of birth missing (living people)
Argentine footballers
Association football forwards
Primera B Metropolitana players
Club Comunicaciones footballers